Xiangyang Subdistrict is a subdistrict in Songshan District, Chifeng, Inner Mongolia, China. , it has 9 residential communities under its administration.

See also 
 List of township-level divisions of Inner Mongolia

References 

Township-level divisions of Inner Mongolia
Chifeng